The 1831 Indiana gubernatorial election took place on August 1, 1831 under the provisions of the Constitution of Indiana. It was the sixth gubernatorial election in the State of Indiana. Noah Noble, a former state representative from Franklin County serving since 1830 as one of the commissioners of the Michigan Road, defeated state Representative James G. Read and outgoing Lieutenant Governor Milton Stapp. The election took place concurrently with races for lieutenant governor and members of the Indiana General Assembly.

James B. Ray, the controversial incumbent governor, was term-limited and ineligible to run for a third consecutive mandate. Ray's popularity had declined precipitously following his narrow re-election in 1828. A contentious battle to shape the composition of the state supreme court made a permanent black mark on his reputation, as Ray was accused of arranging judicial nominations to promote his candidacy for the United States Senate. Much of his term was consumed by efforts to establish a state system of roads and canals. The centerpiece of this system was the Michigan Road running from Madison to Logansport. Over Ray's objections, the legislature named Noble a commissioner on the project to oversee awarding contracts for completion of the road in sections. By the end of 1830 all 163 miles of the road had been let to contractors at a total cost of over $62,000, making significant progress towards the opening of the road.

Ray courted further controversy when he intervened in the case of four enslaved women of color brought into Indiana by their enslaver, William Sewell. Sewell was a Virginian traveling west when he was detained for several days in Indianapolis. Informed of their presence in a free state, the women left Sewell but were quickly retaken and brought before the circuit court on a writ of habeas corpus. Ray testified on the women's behalf, arguing that Sewell had forfeited all legal claim to his so-called property by traveling voluntarily to a free state. Judge Bethuel Morris concurred with Ray, ruling in favor of the women's freedom. Ray's testimony prompted severe rebuke from members of the state legislature. In 1831, the state adopted legislation to limit the migration of free people of color into Indiana, requiring that every African American resident post a $500 bond upon their arrival in the state and register with the local courts. Ray supported the legislation, wishing both to preserve Indiana's status as a free state and to forestall large-scale Black migration.

As early as 1830, Noble and Stapp were mentioned as likely candidates to succeed Ray. As both men were outspoken Anti-Jacksonians, Jacksonians in the state sought to nominate their own candidate, eventually settling on Read. As in the previous election, the intrusion of national parties in state politics was a contentious issue. Internal improvements were a major issue in the campaign, as was slavery. Noble was criticized for using his office as contract commissioner for the Michigan Road to promote his campaign and for facilitating an illegal slave sale eleven years earlier. He nevertheless defeated Read by a narrow margin of 2,500 votes, with Stapp finishing a distant third.

This was the last gubernatorial election before the introduction of formal party organizations in Indiana. While Read's candidacy originated with a gathering of Jacksonian lawmakers, both the candidates and affiliated newspapers denied the election was a partisan contest. Although Andrew Jackson had handily carried Indiana in the most recent presidential election and remained popular in the state, the outspokenly Anti-Jacksonian Noble defeated Read even despite a rival Anti-Jacksonian in the race. Historians Dorothy Riker and Gayle Thornbrough assign no party labels to the candidates.

Candidates

Anti-Jacksonian candidacies
Before the end of 1830, Noble and Stapp were being openly spoken of as candidates for governor in the approaching election. Stapp had narrowly won the 1828 election for lieutenant governor, defeating Jacksonian Abel C. Pepper by 633 votes out of 35,157 cast. While Noble had previously been elected to the state House of Representatives from Franklin County, his most recent service was as contract commissioner for the Michigan Road. Both men announced their candidacies in the pages of the Indiana Journal, a partisan Anti-Jacksonian paper.

In early March 1831, James Scott, who for more than a decade had served as one of the original justices of the state supreme court, asked that his name be put forward as a candidate for governor. Scott had been at the center of a dispute between outgoing Governor Ray and the Indiana Senate over the composition of the court, with Ray resisting senators' calls to renominate Scott and fellow Justice Jesse Lynch Holman for a third consecutive seven-year term. Ray was accused of leveraging the appointments to promote his candidacy for the United States Senate, while Ray charged that the senate had acted improperly by attempting to dictate the actions of the executive. Scott ultimately was not nominated, and his term expired at the end of 1830.

Jacksonian candidacies
As early as January 1830, Indiana Jacksonians planned to bring forward their own candidate in opposition to Noble and Stapp. A gathering of Jacksonian lawmakers and public officials late in the year nominated John Tipton for governor and Read for lieutenant governor. Tipton was a prominent man and outspoken supporter of Jackson, a federal Indian agent, local politician, had served in the War of 1812, and represented Harrison, Crawford, and Floyd counties in the Indiana House of Representatives. In a letter dated December 18, state Representative Joseph Holman informed Tipton of the nominations, though no notice appeared in published accounts of the meeting. Tipton, however, apparently had little interest in the governorship, for he neither acknowledged nor announced his candidacy, possibly because he hoped to be elected to the United States Senate when the legislature met in 1831. In May, Jacksonians, apparently having given up on Tipton, began urging voters to support Read as the candidate for governor in the pages of the Indiana Democrat.

Campaign
The role of national parties in the gubernatorial campaign was as controversial as it had been in 1828. The lack of party labels made it possible for candidates to deny accusations of partisanship even while campaigning for votes on a partisan basis among their own supporters. As his candidacy had originated with an 1830 gathering of Jacksonian officeholders, Read was denounced in the opposition press as a caucus candidate, by implication a careerist and a partisan. Noble was ridiculed for campaigning as an independent among Jacksonians and as a supporter of Henry Clay among Anti-Jacksonians. While Read publicly aligned himself with the Jackson administration, he stopped short of a direct appeal for partisanship, a boundary the Jackson state central committee did not observe.

As the election neared, Noble and Read quickly emerged as the major contenders, as Stapp and the other candidates fell behind. Both candidates were criticized for using their official positions to promote their candidacies: Noble was still serving as contract commissioner for the Michigan Road, while Read had been appointed receiver of the federal land office at Jeffersonville. Read came under scrutiny for allegedly using the United States Postal Service to distribute campaign materials at public expense, but denied personal involvement. Noble's surrogates relied on characterizations of Jacksonians as craven office-seekers, referring to the spoils system, of which Noble had been a victim.

Internal improvements
The American System and proposed state system of roads and canals were major issues in the campaign. Both candidates identified themselves as strongly in favor of internal improvements and a protective tariff. Read argued that projects of national importance should be funded federally, while "local" projects were the provenance of the states. Whereas Noble explicitly endorsed the existing federal tariff, Read carefully expressed support for a "moderate" tariff but avoided committing himself to the Tariff of Abominations, which many Jacksonians still opposed.

Slavery
Noble was a native Virginian and both his father and his father-in-law had owned slaves. When he migrated to Indiana, he brought with him an enslaved woman given to him by his father-in-law and held her at Brookville, Indiana for several days before returning her to slavery in Kentucky. In 1820 he sold the woman at his father-in-law's direction. In light of the circuit court's 1829 ruling in the Sewell case, viz. that an enslaved person intentionally brought into a free state by their enslaver becomes free the moment their feet touch free soil, antislavery critics charged that Noble had illegally sold a free woman back into bondage. Noble countered that he had never intended to keep the woman in Indiana, and had only stopped in Brookville for a couple of days before continuing on to Kentucky; however, the court had explicitly rejected this argument in the Sewell case, when it ruled that enslaved people in transit became free upon entering the state.

The controversy exhibits the complexity of slavery as an issue in Indiana politics. Historian Matthew Salafia suggests the incident is evidence that candidates' "antislavery credentials" remained important in 1831, continuing from the territorial period. Accused of facilitating an illegal slave sale, Noble responded quickly to clarify his intent had not been to introduce slavery to Indiana in violation of the state's constitution. Yet Noble did not deny the sale itself, suggesting by implication the issue for voters was a desire to keep slavery (and African Americans) out of Indiana, and not a general concern for the welfare of Black people. In the August election, Noble was able to carry several traditionally antislavery eastern counties, including counties with large Quaker populations. Salafia argues this is evidence that Noble's popularity was ultimately unaffected by the controversy.

Results
Noble defeated Read by a narrow margin of roughly 2,500 votes, less than Ray's plurality in the closely contested election of 1828. He performed strongest in eastern and central Indiana, while Read's strength lay in the southwestern counties along the Ohio River. Stapp finished a distant third, with 13% of the vote and three counties; Scott, who had withdrawn from the race prior to the election, received 61 votes, while Robert Hanna (who would shortly be appointed to the United States Senate, replacing Noble's late elder brother, James Noble) received one vote.

Despite the candidates' claims to nonpartisanship, the election indicated the strength of Indiana Anti-Jacksonians in downballot races, as opponents of Jackson succeeded in electing David Wallace to succeed Stapp as lieutenant governor and kept their majority in the state legislature. In general, Noble did better in counties that supported John Quincy Adams in the 1828 presidential contest, while Read did better in counties which had supported Jackson, though Noble drew considerable support from Jacksonians.

Results by county

References

Bibliography

Political history of Indiana
Indiana gubernatorial elections